Shockley Taliaferro Shoemake (November 5, 1922 – June 2, 2015) was a lawyer and politician.

Born at White Sands Teacherage near Bennington, Oklahoma, Shoemake graduated from Mount Valley High School in 1939. Shoemaker served in the United States Army during World War II and Korean War. He graduated from University of Oklahoma and then practiced law in Pawhuska, Oklahoma. Shoemake served in the Oklahoma House of Representatives from 1951 to 1961 and was a Democrat. Shoemake died at his home in Pawhuska, Oklahoma from a brain tumor.

Notes

1922 births
2015 deaths
People from Bryan County, Oklahoma
People from Pawhuska, Oklahoma
University of Oklahoma alumni
Oklahoma lawyers
Democratic Party members of the Oklahoma House of Representatives
Deaths from brain tumor
20th-century American lawyers
United States Army personnel of World War II